Mall Road is the main street in Manali, city of Himachal Pradesh, India. The offices of municipal corporation, fire service, and police headquarters are located here. Automobiles, except emergency vehicles are not allowed on this road.

Mall Road has a number of showrooms, department stores, shops, restaurants and cafes. A Himachal emporium that offers handicraft products of Himachal Pradesh like locally designed woolen clothes, branded clothes, pottery items, wooden products, and jewellery is also located here.

References 

Roads in Himachal Pradesh
Pedestrian malls
Transport in Manali, Himachal Pradesh